Lehighton station was a Lehigh Valley Railroad station in Lehighton, Pennsylvania, USA. It was located on the Lehigh Valley main line, and was also the eastern terminus for Hazleton Branch passenger trains, although the branch diverged at Penn Haven Junction, north of Jim Thorpe.

Lehigh Valley service to Lehighton began in 1855. The company began service between Allentown and Easton, Pennsylvania on June 11, 1855; the line was completed to Mauch Chunk (now Jim Thorpe) on September 12. As was common for that era, it used a locally constructed building. The company completed more permanent passenger and freight houses in 1863. Both were located on the west bank of the Lehigh River.

The Lehigh Valley constructed new buildings in Lehighton in 1913. Passenger service to Lehighton outlasted most of the Lehigh Valley by four days. Main line service ended on February 4, 1961 with the discontinuing of the Maple Leaf and the John Wilkes, but service on the Hazleton Branch persisted until February 8. The empty station was demolished in June 1972. Numerous pigeons, the only remaining denizens, reportedly harassed local businesses the following month in search of a new home.

Notes

References 
 
 
 

Former Lehigh Valley Railroad stations
Demolished railway stations in the United States
Railway stations in the United States opened in 1855
Railway stations closed in 1961